The 20919/20920 Chennai Central–Ekta Nagar Superfast Express is a Superfast train belonging to Western Railway zone that runs between  and  in India. It is currently being operated with 20919/20920 train numbers on a weekly basis.

Coach composition

The train has LHB rakes with max speed of 110 kmph. The train consists of 18 coaches:

 1 AC II Tier
 4 AC III Tier
 7 Sleeper coaches
 4 General Unreserved
 2 EOG cum Luggage Rake

Service

20919/Chennai Central – Ekta Nagar Superfast Express has an average speed of 60 km/hr and covers 1701 km in 28 hrs 20 mins.

20920/Ekta Nagar – Chennai Central Superfast Express has an average speed of 55 km/hr and covers 1701 km in 30 hrs 45 mins.

Route and halts 

The important halts of the train are:

Traction

Both trains are hauled by a Vadodara Loco Shed or Tughlakabad Loco Shed-based WAP-7 (HOG)-equipped locomotive from end to end.

Rake sharing

The train shares its rake with 12947/12948 Azimabad Express and 20953/20954 Chennai Central–Ahmedabad Express.

See also 

 Ekta Nagar railway station
 Chennai Central railway station

References

Notes

External links 

20919/Chennai Central - Ekta Nagar Superfast Express India Rail Info
20920/Ekta Nagar - Chennai Central Superfast Express India Rail Info

Rail transport in Gujarat
Rail transport in Tamil Nadu
Rail transport in Maharashtra
Rail transport in Andhra Pradesh
Rail transport in Karnataka
Transport in Vadodara
Transport in Chennai
Railway services introduced in 2021